Jock of the Bushveld is a 1986 South African adventure film directed by Gray Hofmeyr and produced by Duncan MacNeillie for Duncan MacNeillie Production and Toron International. The film stars Jonathan Rands, Jocelyn Broderick and Michael Brunner in lead role along with Gordon Mulholland, Wilson Dunster in supportive roles and the dog Umfubu.

The film is based on the 1907 novel by same name written by Irish writer James Percy FitzPatrick who went South Africa in 1800s and experience several incidents in the jungle.

Plot

In 1886, 20-year-old Percy Fitzpatrick from Cape Town sets out for the Delagoa Bay in Transvaal to dig for gold. On his way there he prevents a weakly puppy, Jock, from being drowned and adopts him. When Percy finally reaches his destination, there is no gold anymore, so he starts out as a foreman. Afterwards, he and Jock live through many adventures involving wild animals and slave drivers.

Cast
 Jonathan Rands as Percy Fitzpatrick
 Jocelyn Broderick as Lilian Cubitt
 Michael Brunner as Field Cornet Seedling
 Wilson Dunster as George Barnard
 Umfubu the dog as Jock
 Gordon Mulholland as Tom Barnett
 Marloe Scott Wilson as Maggie Maguire
 Nadine Kadey as Olivia Jones
 Jim Neal as Bill Saunderson
 Fred Baylis as Warthog George
 Oliver Ngwenya as Jim
 Fiona Fraser as Mrs. Cubitt

References

External links
 
 Jock, le meilleur chien du monde on YouTube

1986 films
1980s adventure films
South African adventure films
Afrikaans-language films
English-language South African films
Films set in the 1880s
Films set in the 1890s